Elections to Burnley Borough Council in Lancashire, England were held on 4 May 2006.  One third of the council was up for election, with by-elections in the Bank Hall and Brunshaw wards. The by-elections followed the resignations of (Bank Hall) Labour councillor Caroline Kavanagh and (Brunshaw) BNP-turned-independent-with-links-to-Labour councillor Maureen Stowe (both last elected in 2003). No party won overall control of the council.

Long-serving Council and Labour group leader Stuart Caddy and his deputy Peter Kenyon both lost their seats, with Andy Tatchell becoming group leader. Liberal Democrat leader Gordon Birtwistle emerged as the council leader after a coalition formed between the Liberal Democrats and Conservatives.

After the election, the composition of the council was
Liberal Democrat 16
Labour 16
British National Party 7
Conservative 5
 Others 1

Election result

Ward results

References

BBC News 2006 Burnley Election Results Accessed 2010
Burnley Council Election Results 2006 Accessed 2010

2006 English local elections
2006
2000s in Lancashire